Bert Robert Lewis, Sr. (November 11, 1931 – April 24, 1979) was an American veterinarian and politician.

Lewis was born in Hutchinson, Kansas and was an African-American. He received his degrees in animal husbandry in 1953, biological science in 1958, and in veterinarian medicine in 1960 from Kansas State University. Lewis served in the United States Army during the Korean War. In 1962, Lewis moved to St. Louis Park, Minnesota and was a veterinarian. Lewis served on the St. Louis Park School Board from 1967 to 1971 and on the Minnesota Board of Education. Lewis served in the Minnesota Senate from 1973 until his death in 1979 and was a Democrat. He died from a heart attack at his home in Golden Valley, Minnesota. His body laid in state at the Minnesota State Capitol.

Notes

1931 births
1979 deaths
People from Hutchinson, Kansas
People from Golden Valley, Minnesota
People from St. Louis Park, Minnesota
Military personnel from Kansas
American veterinarians
Male veterinarians
Kansas State University alumni
African-American state legislators in Minnesota
School board members in Minnesota
Democratic Party Minnesota state senators
20th-century African-American people